George Dawson may refer to:

Politicians 
 George Dawson (Northern Ireland politician) (1961–2007), Northern Ireland politician
 George Walker Wesley Dawson (1858–1936), Canadian politician
 George Oscar Dawson (1825–1865), Georgia politician and Confederate officer
 George Robert Dawson (1790–1856), Anglo-Irish Tory politician

Others 
 George Dawson (author) (1898–2001), American author, learned to read at age 98
 George Dawson (businessman) (1907–1985), British businessman and convicted fraudster
 George Dawson (cricketer) (1799–1843), English cricketer
 George Dawson (preacher) (1821–1876), English preacher and civic activist
 George Dawson (trainer) (1853–1913), British racehorse trainer
 George Geoffrey Dawson (1874–1944), English editor of The Times
 George Mercer Dawson (1849–1901), Canadian surveyor
 George William Dawson, Confederate officer from Alabama, first captain of the Perote Guards
 George Dawson (boxer) (1867–?), Australian boxer